Jonah House is a faith-based community centered on the concept of "Nonviolence, resistance and community". Founded in 1973 by a group that included Philip Berrigan, then a Catholic priest, and Elizabeth McAlister, formerly a Catholic nun, Jonah House has grown to be situated on a  area of land in Baltimore, Maryland encompassing St. Peter's Cemetery, caring for the grounds.

Jonah House has been specifically regarded as a prime example of a Catholic Worker House of Resistance.

Nonviolence

Much of the non-violent resistance direct actions undertaken by Jonah House have taken the form of Plowshares actions. Additionally non-violence is practiced in the community both as a way of thought and action. Education of the injustice present in violence is contemplated.

Food pantry
Jonah House donates food and clothes to persons in need.

Sister communities

Jonah House is part of a network of individuals and communities along the east coast that calls itself "The Atlantic Life Community".

The Pacific Life Community is a similar organization encompassing the west coast of the United States of America, Pacific Islands and East Asia.

Jonah House is also a sister community with Dorothy Day Catholic Worker House (in D.C) Viva House Catholic Worker, and The P. Francis Murphy Justice/Peace Initiative.

External links
 Jonah House site

References
 Plowshare Events
 Jonah House under siege: convicts of strong conviction
 Praise for Philip Berrigan and Jonah House as central to the Atlantic Life Community and the Plowshares Movement
 Do-Gooders

Catholic Worker Movement
Christian pacifism
Peace organizations based in the United States
Anti–nuclear weapons movement
Civil disobedience
Religious activism
Anti–Iraq War groups
DePaul University Special Collections and Archives holdings
Intentional communities in the United States